"Sober" is a song recorded by South Korean boy band Big Bang. It was released digitally on July 1, 2015 by YG Entertainment, as the third single from Made, being  included in the single album D. "Sober" was written by Teddy, G-Dragon and T.O.P, and was produced by the first two with Choice37.

Background 
The first poster of "Sober" was released on June 27, 2015, revealing the name of the song and the production credits. The single was released on July 1. The release was supported by a live countdown on Naver Starcast on June 30, 11 pm. An exact verse that G-Dragon sings towards the end of "Sober" was actually first performed during the 2013 Mnet Asian Music Awards as a prelude to his song "Crooked". The music video was directed by Han Sa Min, who worked before with Bigbang on "Loser", "Bad Boy" and "Blue".

Composition and reception 
"Sober" has a "more rock-driven sound", an unusual genre for BigBang, who usually go for electronic and hip hop-based sounds. The track shows off lush guitars mixed with banging percussion, and incorporates a "very high energy rock vibe" with a spunk delivery. Fuse said that the song fits on alternative radio and it's something you can hear on the Warped Tour, that is famous of alternative and punk rock music. The Korean website Osen called it "an exciting summer song that perfectly fits the [season]."

The music video was described by Billboard as "going mad in a colorful world." China Topix noted that "Sober" was filmed in a unique style, keeping the summer mood in mind.

Chart performance 
"Sober" sold 276,180 downloads in its first week on the Gaon Chart, and debuted at number two in the Digital and Download charts, seven on both the BGM and Streaming charts with over 3.9 million streams.

The song charted at number three on Billboard World Digital Songs, The song ranked at eleven on the most popular Korean singles of 2015 in Taiwan by music streaming service KKBOX.

Chart performance

Weekly charts

Monthly charts

Year-end charts

Sales

Accolades

Release history

References

External links
 

BigBang (South Korean band) songs
2015 singles
2015 songs
Korean-language songs
Songs written by Teddy Park
Songs written by G-Dragon
Songs written by T.O.P